A Time for Defiance is a 1998 Spanish war drama film directed by Antonio Mercero about the Spanish Civil War. It stars Gabino Diego and Leonor Watling alongside Luis Cuenca and Adriana Ozores.

Plot
In Madrid, during the bombing of November 1936, in the Spanish Civil War, the Republican Government decided on the evacuation of paintings from the Prado Museum. Manuel, a 28-year-old security guard, finds a self-portrait of Goya abandoned in one corner. He hides the painting and flees the bombing of his house.

Cast

Release 
The film was theatrically released in Spain on 18 December 1998. It was also entered into the 21st Moscow International Film Festival where it won the Special Silver St. George.

Accolades 

|-
| align = "center" rowspan = "6" | 1999 || rowspan = "6" | 13th Goya Awards || Best Actress || Leonor Watling ||  || rowspan = "6" | 
|-
| Best Actor || Gabino Diego || 
|-
| Best Supporting Actress || Adriana Ozores ||  
|-
| Best Costume Design || Javier Artiñano || 
|-
| Production Supervision || Mikel Nieto || 
|-
| Best Special Effects || Juan Ramón Molina, Alfonso Nieto || 
|}

See also 
 List of Spanish films of 1998

References

External links
 

1998 films
1990s Spanish-language films
1990s war drama films
Films set in Madrid
Spanish Civil War films
Spanish war drama films
1998 drama films
1990s Spanish films
Enrique Cerezo PC films